The Big Nickel is a nine-metre (30 ft) replica of a 1951 Canadian nickel, located at the grounds of the Dynamic Earth science museum in Greater Sudbury, Ontario, Canada, and is the world's largest depiction of a coin. The twelve-sided nickel is located on a small hill overlooking the intersection of Municipal Road 55 and Big Nickel Drive at the westernmost end of the Gatchell neighbourhood.

The Big Nickel celebrated its 45th anniversary on July 22, 2009 with a "birthday party" on the grounds of Dynamic Earth (Ontario), including a display of coins from Science North's Inco Coin Collection.

Origin

The idea for the Big Nickel began in 1963 when Ted Szilva, at the time a 28-year-old City of Sudbury fireman, read in the Sudbury Star of a contest, sponsored by the Sudbury Canada Centennial Committee (Maurice Lacourciere, Chairman), asking Sudbury residents how the City should celebrate the upcoming Canadian Centennial. Szilva put forward the suggestion for a major tourist attraction featuring a giant replica of a five-cent coin, an underground mine and a mining science centre. Szilva's idea was rejected because the committee felt that "it did not have sufficient use for the citizens of Sudbury as such".

By this time, Szilva had independently researched his idea, and had concluded that it could indeed be a viable and worthwhile project. He began to make this dream a reality by scouting out the highest hills in Sudbury to find the best location. On December 11, 1963, he purchased  of land from Walter Holdich for $1,000.00 with a $25.00 down payment. The land was ideal because of its unique location between Sudbury and Copper Cliff. To the west, the large hill provided a sensational view of the INCO mining and smelting complex, including the nightly slag dump, while to the east one had a beautiful view of the city of Sudbury.

This acquisition would ensure that Szilva would have access to his land. INCO did lease the requested land, for 99 years at $1.00 per year. Eventually he bought the leased land from INCO, in addition to another . Szilva contracted a firm to build the Big Nickel road, and Pioneer Construction paved the new road. The Big Nickel was eventually built on the crest of the hill, three feet outside of the city of Sudbury limits in Copper Cliff Ontario, which did not require a building permit.

Fund raising
Not yet financially secure, Szilva needed investors in order to make the dream a reality. Three men from Sudbury indicated that they would invest, but when the time came, they refused to put any money into Szilva's new company, Nickel Monument Development Ltd.

Szilva eventually owned 99.9% of the shares of the company. In order to raise the money for the development of the project, Szilva had a series of commemorative coins struck which represented each of the monuments to be erected at the park. To have worldwide appeal, he conceived the idea for a numismatic park and called it the Canadian Centennial Numismatic Park. The Big Nickel would be its centrepiece. The uniqueness of this park appealed to the numismatists worldwide, who purchased the medallions in order to support the construction and development of the park.

One such medallion package, mailed out to purchasers in 1964 from Nickel Monument Development contained three coins and a descriptive project brochure. Two of the coins were identical silver-dollar-sized 0.999 silver content Kennedy commemorative coins. The third was a silver dollar sized copper-coloured Kennedy commemorative coin. All three coins were identically marked on the obverse with a Kennedy profile above the words 'In God We Trust, 1964' surrounded by 'Canadian Centennial Numismatic Park, Sudbury, Canada'. On the reverse, each was marked with an eternal flame above the words 'And so let the word go forth that the torch has been lit,' and the words 'John Fitzgerald Kennedy 1917.1963'. The brochure discussed the medallions, the park ('Canada's Most Unique Tourist Attraction—Canadian Centennial Numismatic Park'), other fundraising ideas, and planned future attractions.

In December 1963 Szilva had earned enough funds through mail-order sales to proceed with the first phase of the proposed development. He chose the 1951 five-cent piece and "coined" the phrase "The Big Nickel". Artist Steve Trenka designed the 1951 five-cent piece. His rendition of a nickel refinery was not based on any actual complex, though some believed it to be the INCO refinery in Sudbury. In 1951 the INCO smelter had three stacks, not one (unlike the five-cent piece) and the Inco Superstack which supposedly appeared in the centre of the buildings, was not erected until 1971. It would seem that The Big Nickel was the cause of these rumours, because of the similarity of its design to the five-cent coin and its proximity to the INCO complex.

The 1951 design was chosen for the Big Nickel since it marked the bicentennial of the chemical isolation of nickel by the Swedish chemist Baron Axel Frederic Cronstedt. This metal, of course, played a large role in the establishment of Sudbury as a mining town.

Before 1751, the element now known as nickel played havoc with refiners. Thought to be an alloy of copper, German miners coined the term, "Kupfernickel" or "Old Nick's Copper". This "Devil's Copper" could not be extracted with the technology of the time. Cronstedt, however, was able to prove that the trouble refiners faced was due to an unknown element which he named nickel.

Szilva ultimately chose the 1951 Canadian nickel, minted by the Royal Canadian Mint in 1951, to commemorate the 200th anniversary of the isolation of nickel as a metal, to show where Sudbury's wealth came from, and to be a lasting tribute to the men and women who mined and processed the minerals in the Sudbury Basin. In short, the nickel was intended to exhibit Sudbury's pride to the whole world.

Design and construction

Bruno Cavallo, a local sign manufacturer and artist, also had an idea of constructing a five-cent coin out of chromium. He contacted Szilva, and the two proceeded with the construction of the 1951 nickel. It was to be built with stainless steel, so it would endure the harsh Sudbury elements. Cavallo spent several months forming the artistic work. The first step was to project the image of the 1951 five-cent piece against a large wall at the Sudbury Steelworkers Hall. After projecting the image, it was traced by Szilva and Cavallo over a period of two nights onto large, thick pieces of brown paper. The traced sections were then transported to Cavallo's shop where he handcrafted the numerous steel sheets from a wooden mould. The individual parts were then fastened to a moulded girdle structure and joined with silver solder.

Szilva worked with Jim Nemis, whose company Noront Steel was contracted to engineer, fabricate and install the framework of the Big Nickel. The large stainless steel panels were fabricated by Dalite Corporation of Toronto and shipped to the Big Nickel site in May 1964.

The artistic work such as the design of the King George VI head, the numerals, maple leaf and the refinery were contracted to Cavallo Signs. All artistic work was affixed to the stainless steel panels on site.

It was made of various ore-bearing rocks, field stone, and minerals mined in the Sudbury Basin in order to indicate the source of wealth in the Sudbury area. Upon its completion in 1964, the total cost of the construction of the Big Nickel was approximately $35,000.

Opening
On July 27, 1964, the park was officially opened. Szilva was extremely pleased that John Fisher, the Canadian Centennial commissioner, had accepted his invitation to be on hand to unveil the Big Nickel Monument to a crowd of 1,500. There was extensive media coverage of the event by The Sudbury Star, Canadian Coin News, and other Canadian publications as well as television coverage. The day marked both the culmination of many months of planning, and the beginning of an era, which would see The Big Nickel develop into a world-renowned landmark, and Sudbury into a northern tourist centre.

In an attempt to market the park as a world-class tourist attraction, Szilva co-operated with the Sudbury Jaycees under president Allan Barnard in entering a float into the November 28, 1964 Grey Cup Parade with a replica of the monument along with the newly crowned 'Miss Big Nickel'.

The underground model mine was built in 1965 by J.C. MacIsaac, of MacIsaac Mining and Tunnelling Co., and was expanded by the same company in 1969. Not only was the underground mine visited by over 100,000 people every year, but the mine represented the first time in Canadian history that a private enterprise and an educational institution, Cambrian College, would collaborate in order to provide on-site practical training in all facets of mining for students.

The park was always expanding and adding new features. Some of these features included helicopter rides, a train track around the park carrying 55 passengers, a carousel, the famous "jail", moon module, and informative film. Articles and pictures featuring the Big Nickel appear in hundreds of books, and it is recognized as an international landmark.

The Big Nickel, as the world's only numismatic coin park, also featured coin monuments other than the 1951 nickel. Some of these coin monuments were the $20 gold coin monument (featuring the Royal Coat of Arms of Canada), the Kennedy half-dollar coin memorial (featuring an eternal flame), the fantasy copper (Canadian one cent 1965) penny, and the Lincoln coin memorial (1965 American penny). There is no public record of the dismantling or current location of these other numismatic monuments, though pictures still exist. Mayor Joe Fabbro dedicated the wampum monument and Brotherhood of Man Memorial in May 1975. This memorial symbolized the early money traded by Canada's Aboriginal peoples and European settlers.

Sudbury Science Centre
In March 1975, Szilva expanded on the idea of creating a world-class mining science centre and submitted his proposal to the provincial minister of tourism in Toronto and to the Regional Municipality of Sudbury. Similar to the proposal of the Big Nickel, the idea was rejected by the government. The government at the time refused to give money to private enterprise. According to documented proposals and files, Szilva continued his efforts, and in 1980 he convinced the Regional Municipality of Sudbury to proceed with the development of a major tourist attraction, as the government was willing to grant the funds to non-profit organizations. Szilva sold the Big Nickel to the Regional Municipality of Sudbury for $550,000, and the Sudbury Science Centre, later to be named Science North, was founded.

Dynamic Earth

On January 22, 2001, the Big Nickel was dismantled for refurbishing of both the coin and the facility. Once refurbished, the coin was installed on the grounds of Science North, and the original Big Nickel site was redesigned into the Dynamic Earth  facility. On May 10, 2003, the coin was moved back to a plain kickstand on the Dynamic Earth grounds, and the stones of the original pedestal were discarded.

See also

 Echo Bay, Ontario is home to the Big Loonie
 Campbellford, Ontario is home to the Big Toonie

References

External links

 Dynamic Earth (Ontario)

Roadside attractions in Canada
Monuments and memorials in Ontario
Culture of Greater Sudbury
Buildings and structures in Greater Sudbury
Coins of Canada
1964 sculptures
Tourist attractions in Greater Sudbury
Novelty buildings in Canada
1964 establishments in Ontario